iFG Farglory Square is a shopping center in Xizhi District, New Taipei, Taiwan that opened on 23 October 2015. Owned and operated by the Farglory Group, it is the first and largest shopping mall in the district. It occupies levels B1 to 3 of the skyscraper complex Farglory U-Town.

Location
The location of the mall is opposite to the Oriental Science Park and in close proximity to the Xike railway station.

Floor Guide

Gallery

See also
List of tourist attractions in Taiwan
Farglory U-Town

References

External links

2015 establishments in Taiwan
Shopping malls in New Taipei
Shopping malls established in 2015